Deserters Peak is a mountain summit in British Columbia, Canada.

Description

Deserters Peak, elevation 2,274-meters (7,461-feet), is the highest point of the Deserters Range, which is a subrange of the Muskwa Ranges of the Northern Rocky Mountains. It is situated along the east side of the Rocky Mountain Trench near the northern end of Williston Lake. Precipitation runoff from the peak drains into Deserters Creek and Rubyred Creek which are both tributaries of the Finlay River.

Etymology
The mountain's toponym was officially adopted June 4, 1953, by the Geographical Names Board of Canada. The mountain and Deserters Creek are named in association with Deserters Canyon which is immediately west of the mountain where the creek flows into Finlay River. The canyon's name refers to two men in Samuel Black's 1824 exploration party who decamped (deserted) at this location on May 28 during an expedition to find the headwaters of the Finlay River.

Climate

Based on the Köppen climate classification, Deserters Peak is located in a subarctic climate zone with cold, snowy winters, and mild summers. Winter temperatures can drop below −20 °C with wind chill factors below −30 °C.

See also
 
 Geography of British Columbia

References

External links
 Deserters Peak: weather forecast

Canadian Rockies
Two-thousanders of British Columbia
Cassiar Land District